The following is a list of notable events and releases of the year 1983 in Norwegian music.

Events

March
 25 – The 10th Vossajazz started in Voss, Norway (March 25 – 27).

May
 18 – 11th Nattjazz started in Bergen, Norway (May 18 – June 1).

August
 21 – The 14th Kalvøyafestivalen started at Kalvøya near by Oslo.

Albums released

Unknown date

A
 Arild Andersen
 Sheila (SteepleChase Records) with Sheila Jordan

O
 Oslo 13
 Anti-Therapy (Odin Records)

R
 Inger Lise Rypdal
 Just For You (A/S Studio B)

T
 Jahn Teigen
 Cheek To Cheek (Odin Records) with Anita Skorgan

Deaths

 May
 23 – Finn Mortensen, composer, critic and educator (born 1922).

 October
 16 – Øivin Fjeldstad, orchestra conductor and violinist who led the Oslo Philharmonic (born 1903).

Births

 January
 20 – Eivind Lønning, jazz trumpeter.

 February
 7 – Benedicte Maurseth, traditional folk singer and fiddler.

 April
 4 – Henrik Maarud, blues and rock drummer (The Grand).
 20 – Gaute Ormåsen, country and pop singer.

 May
 25 – Rune Nergaard, jazz upright bassist (Bushman's Revenge).

 June
 24 – Gard Nilssen, jazz drummer.
 30 – Espen Berg, jazz pianist, arranger, and composer, Trondheim Jazz Orchestra.

 July
 1 – Marit Larsen, pop singer and songwriter.
 16 – Tuva Syvertsen, singer, Hardanger fiddler and accordionist (Valkyrien Allstars).
 22 – Andreas Ulvo, jazz pianist, organist, keyboarder and composer (Eple Trio).

 September
 30 – Carmen Elise Espenæs, singer and songwriter (Midnattsol).

 October
 14 – Andreas Stensland Løwe, jazz pianist.

 November
 3 – Myrna Braza, singer and composer.
 10 – Svein Magnus Furu, jazz saxophonist, composer, and music journalist.

 December
 24 – Sigrun Tara Øverland, singer, songwriter, multi-instrumentalist, and music producer.

 Unknown date
 Guro Skumsnes Moe, jazz upright bass player, composer and singer.

See also
 1983 in Norway
 Music of Norway
 Norway in the Eurovision Song Contest 1983

References

 
Norwegian music
Norwegian
Music
1980s in Norwegian music